Henry Pether (1800–1880) was an English landscape painter famous for his depiction of moonlit scenes of 19th century Britain, Paris, and Venice. His father Abraham and older brother Sebastian Pether also painted moonlit scenes. Together they were known as the "Moonlight Pethers". He was also an inventor of lamps, architectural materials, and tiles.

Life and work
Henry Pether was born in February 1800, the son of landscape painter Abraham Pether (1752–1812) and younger brother of artist Sebastian Pether (1793-1844). His father and his brother's works were often imaginary. Henry was particularly noted for his "control of detail, atmosphere and colouring". Henry Pether's paintings are frequently incorrectly attributed to his father and to his brother and vice versa. However, Henry generally signed his paintings, which were more realistic and refined, whilst those of his brother Sebastian had more greenish tones.

He was known for his paintings along the Thames, many of which were painted between 1850 and 1865. Pether is detailed in his painting of Greenwich Hospital's architecture and river scene, which are illuminated by a full moon. He also painted moonlight landscapes in Paris, Venice and Scotland.

Between 1828 and 1862 Henry Pether exhibited at the Royal Academy. He also exhibited at the British Institution and with the Royal Society of British Artists. His works are among the collections of Tate, the City of London, Royal Museums Greenwich, Hastings Museum, the National Gallery of Victoria, and the Yale Center for British Art.

Pether lived in the Camden and Clapham boroughs in London, and Southampton. In 1837, he was described as a surveyor, engineer, artist, and an architect when he was an inmate in a debtor's prison in London. He applied for patents for lamps, architectural materials, and tiles, the latter of which was exhibited at the Great Exhibition of 1851. At that time, he was married to Sarah and had three children: Fanny, Harry, and Kate who ranged from nine to fourteen years of age. The family lived at Kennington in 1851.

He died on Stockwell Green in London on 20 February 1880, a few days after his 80th birthday. Papers, images, and other documentation of Pether's works are held at the Frick Art Reference Library.

Gallery

See also
 Night in paintings (Western art)

Notes

References

1800 births
1880 deaths
English landscape painters
Moon in art
Artists from London
Artists from Southampton
People imprisoned for debt
English inventors